In human anatomy, the eponychium is the thickened layer of skin at the base of the fingernails and toenails. It can also be called the medial or proximal nail fold. The eponychium differs from the cuticle; the eponychium comprises live skin cells whilst the cuticle is dead skin cells.   Its function is to protect the area between the nail and epidermis from exposure to bacteria. The vascularization pattern is similar to that of perionychium.

In hoofed animals, the eponychium is the deciduous hoof capsule in fetuses and newborn foals, and is a part of the permanent hoof in older animals.

The word eponychium comes .

See also
 Hyponychium
 Lunula

References

Nail anatomy